Irene Epple-Waigel (born 18 June 1957) is a German former alpine skier. She won a total of 11 Alpine Skiing World Cup races and two World Cups, in giant slalom and combined (both in 1982). She also won a silver medal at the 1980 Winter Olympic Games in giant slalom. In the 1978 FIS Alpine Skiing World Championships at Garmisch-Partenkirchen she won the silver medal in the downhill. On 9 January 1983 she won the first women's World Cup Super-G race, held in Verbier.

In 1992 she completed her medical studies in Munich, and in November 1994 married Theo Waigel, who was the German Finance Minister from 1989 to 1998. In 1980 she was named the German Sportswoman of the Year. She is the sister of alpine skier Maria Epple.

World Cup victories

References

External links

1957 births
Living people
People from Ostallgäu
Sportspeople from Swabia (Bavaria)
German female alpine skiers
Spouses of German politicians
Olympic medalists in alpine skiing
FIS Alpine Ski World Cup champions
Olympic silver medalists for West Germany
Olympic alpine skiers of West Germany
Alpine skiers at the 1976 Winter Olympics
Alpine skiers at the 1980 Winter Olympics
Alpine skiers at the 1984 Winter Olympics
Recipients of the Cross of the Order of Merit of the Federal Republic of Germany
Medalists at the 1980 Winter Olympics
20th-century German women